Zalán Kerezsi (born 17 July 2003) is a Hungarian professional footballer who plays for Budapest Honvéd.

Career statistics
.

References

2003 births
Living people
People from Nyíregyháza
Hungarian footballers
Association football forwards
Budapest Honvéd FC players
BFC Siófok players
Nemzeti Bajnokság I players
Sportspeople from Szabolcs-Szatmár-Bereg County